Mikka Kirsten Hansen (born 11 November 1975) is a Danish international footballer who played as a forward for the Denmark national team. She was part of the team at the 1999 FIFA World Cup.

Club career
Hansen played for the USL W-League club Denver Diamonds, where she was the league's top assist provider in 1996 and second top goal scorer in 1998. In January 1999, she moved to Denmark to play for Frederiksberg Boldklub on a semi-professional basis. In summer 1999, after playing in the FIFA World Cup, Hansen signed a one and a half-year contract with Fortuna Hjørring. By May 2000, Hansen had grown weary of football and had started competing as an elite cyclist instead.

Women's United Soccer Association (WUSA), the first official professional women's soccer league in the United States, began in 2001. Hansen was a ninth-round draft pick (70th overall in the global draft) by the Carolina Courage. In 2001 Hansen started seven of her 19 regular season appearances, scoring once. She was released by the team in January 2002.

International career
Hansen was briefly part of the United States national under-20 team, but decided to play for Denmark at senior level. She won her first cap in a 1–1 draw with Australia at the 1999 Algarve Cup on March 14, 1999. Deployed on the left wing by Denmark, Hansen won a total of 12 caps, all in 1999, including a 3–0 1999 FIFA World Cup Group A defeat by the United States at Giants Stadium on June 19, 1999.

References

External links
 
 Carolina Courage player profile (archived)

1975 births
Living people
Danish women's footballers
Women's association football forwards
Denmark women's international footballers
1999 FIFA Women's World Cup players
Soccer players from San Jose, California
Santa Clara Broncos women's soccer players
USL W-League (1995–2015) players
American people of Danish descent
Fortuna Hjørring players
Women's United Soccer Association players
Carolina Courage players
Denver Diamonds players